Philip Rogers House, also known as Penn Wick, is a historic home located in Warwick Township, Chester County, Pennsylvania.  It was built about 1750, and is a -story, five-bay-by-two-bay, random fieldstone dwelling.  It has a gable roof with gable end chimneys.  A -story kitchen wing was added before 1825.

It was added to the National Register of Historic Places in 1973.

References

Houses on the National Register of Historic Places in Pennsylvania
Georgian architecture in Pennsylvania
Houses completed in 1790
Houses in Chester County, Pennsylvania
National Register of Historic Places in Chester County, Pennsylvania